Fábio Medina Osório (Porto Alegre, July 31, 1967) is a lawyer, professor, and former Attorney General of Brazil. He is the former State Prosecutor of Rio Grande do Sul, and was appointed Attorney General of Brazil by Acting President Michel Temer.

Biography

Medina Osório graduated from the Federal University of Rio Grande do Sul in 1990, a master's degree in law from the same institution in 1997, and a PhD from Complutense University of Madrid in 2003. He is a specialist in the study of the law of corruption. He became a prosecutor in the Public Ministry of the State of Rio Grande do Sul in December 1991. Medina Osório was appointed the Deputy Secretary of Justice and Security of Rio Grande do Sul by governor Germano Rigotto in 2003, and served in the position until 2005. He resigned to go into private law practice in January 2006. Medina Osório also chairs the Instituto Internacional de Estudos de Direito do Estado (International Institute for the Study of Public Law).

Attorney General of Brazil

Medina Osório was appointed Attorney General on May 12, 2016 by the interim government of Michel Temer, and the appointment was published in the Official Gazette (DOU) on the following day. He resigned from his private law firm, Medina Osório Advogados, the same week. He later left his post as Attorney General when President Temer replaced him with Grace Maria Mendonça. Mr. Medina Osório  claimed that he had been fired after seeking damages from construction companies involved in the Petrobras scheme. He explained that Mr. Temer's government was seeking to “smother” the inquiry of the operation Car Wash.

References

1967 births
Living people
20th-century Brazilian lawyers
People from Porto Alegre
21st-century Brazilian lawyers
Attorneys General of Brazil